Romanian Names is the seventh album by American singer-songwriter John Vanderslice.  It was released in the United States on May 19, 2009.

Critical praise
In a review by NME in May 2009, Laura Snapes said, "Not since Bon Iver's 'For Emma, Forever Ago' has there been such an accomplished album of torch songs...if you can spend a little time with 'Romanian Names' and not feel duly captivated by its sun-kissed longing, West Coast harmonies and occasional krautrock minimalism, your heart's probably made of stone."

Track listing
"Tremble and Tear" (2:45)
"Fetal Horses" (3:57)
"C & O Canal" (3:16)
"Too Much Time" (3:29)
"D.I.A.L.O." (3:11)
"Forest Knolls" (3:54)
"Oblivion" (2:05)
"Sunken Union Boat" (2:48)
"Romanian Names" (1:39)
"Carina Constellation" (3:40)
"Summer Stock" (2:53)
"Hard Times" (3:47)

References 

2009 albums
John Vanderslice albums
Dead Oceans albums